Double Barrel may refer to:
 Multiple-barrel firearm
 "Double Barrel" (song), a 1970 reggae single by Dave and Ansell Collins
 Double Barrel (album), a 2009 hip hop album by Marco Polo and Torae
 Double Barrel (2015 film), a Malayalam crime-comedy
 Double Barrel (2017 film), a Philippine action film

See also
 Double-barrelled (disambiguation)